Parkinsonia raimondoi is a species of flowering plant in the pea family, Fabaceae, that is endemic to Somalia. It is threatened by habitat loss.

References

raimondoi
Endemic flora of Somalia
Near threatened flora of Africa
Taxonomy articles created by Polbot